Standish with Langtree is an electoral ward in Wigan, England. It forms part of Wigan Metropolitan Borough Council, as well as the parliamentary constituency of Wigan.

Councillors 
The ward is represented by three councillors: Adam Marsh (Con), Debbie Parkinson (Lab), and Raymond Whittingham (Con).

 indicates seat up for re-election.

Notes and references

Wigan Metropolitan Borough Council Wards
Standish, Greater Manchester